Aloxe-Corton is a commune in the Côte-d'Or department in the Bourgogne-Franche-Comté region of eastern France.

The inhabitants of the commune are known as Aloxois or Aloxoises

Geography 
The commune lies about 4 km north by north-east of Beaune and 40 km south-west of Dijon at the northern end of the Côte de Beaune.  There, the village of Aloxe is dominated by the Corton hill, nestled between the neighbouring communes of Ladoix-Serrigny and Pernand-Vergelesses. The D974 road forms the south-eastern border of the commune but does not enter. Access to the commune is by the D115D running north-west off the D974 to the village then continuing north-west to join the D18 road south of Pernand-Vergelesses. There is an extensive network of country roads throughout the commune which is entirely farmland, with the edge of the Bois de Corton in the north forming the northern border.

The only stream in the commune is the Fosse des Branots in the south flowing to the east.

There are no villages or hamlets in the commune other than Aloxe-Corton.

Climate
Aloxe-Corton has a oceanic climate (Köppen climate classification Cfb).

Etymology 
Aloxe-Corton comes from the Celtic "al" meaning "high place".

In French, Aloxe-Corton is pronounced "Aloxs-Corton".

The name of its Grand Cru vineyard Corton was added to that of the village on 22 March 1862.

History 
Legend has it that the Emperor Charlemagne granted the lands in 775, initially planting some 70 vines. The vines were located in the area of "Curtis Otto" (i.e. Corton). The beneficiaries were the Canons of the Collegiate Church of St. Andoche Saulieu.

Postcards on Aloxe-Corton
Henri Poisot has a large collection of postcards of the village with nearly one hundred and fifty and still growing.

He also has a large number of photos and old documents. Henri Poisot published a book entitled: 1728-1999 - History of the Cartography of the Great Vineyards of Burgundy , a book of 102 pages with three folding maps. The book is available only from the Athenaeum in Beaune and from the Author.

Heraldry

Administration

List of Successive Mayors of Aloxe-Corton

Twinning
Aloxe-Corton has twinning associations with:
 Ürzig (Germany) since 1966.

Demography
In 2017 the commune had 134 inhabitants.

Sites and Monuments

Aloxe-Corton has three castles and a church:
Château de Corton Grancey built in part in 1749. The Cellars and the winery were built in 1834
Château Corton André, built at the end of the 19th century, it replaced a charming 18th century house
Château de Corton transformed between 1885 and 1890 to replace some very old buildings that had  belonged to the family of Vergnette de la Motte, for several centuries. Before that it belonged to the Cîteaux Abbey
Church of Saint-Médard from 1890 by Pinchard which replaced an ancient chapel which stood on the Place du Chapitre for almost 1000 years. It contains several items that are registered as historical objects:
Bas-Relief: Christ appearing to Saint Benezet (16th century)
Painting: Benefits of the faith, expectations, and true love (16th century)
Painting: Saint John the Baptist, Saint Catherine, Saint Gilles and a donor (1579)

There is also a Lavoir (Public laundry) (1902) which is registered as a historical monument.

Wine 

Aloxe-Corton is one of the wine communes of the Côte de Beaune. The southern and eastern parts of the Corton hill, including most of its vineyards, are located in the commune, including vineyards used to produce wines under the two Grand Cru appellation Corton (mostly red, some white) and Corton-Charlemagne (only white).

Wineries 
 Domaine Maurice Chapuis
 Domaine Bruno Collin
 Domaine Franck Follin-Arbelet
 Domaine Comte Sénard
 Domaine Michel Voarick
 Domaine Freddy Meuneveaux
 Domaine Louise Perrin
 Domaine Latour
 Château de Corton-André
 Domaine Jean
 Domaine Carlos

See also 
 French wine
 Route des Grands Crus
 Communes of the Côte-d'Or department

Bibliography
Historical Notice on the village of Aloxe-Corton, Charles Bigarne, Beaune, 1899 
Monograph on the Commune of Aloxe-Corton, Joseph Delissey, Beaune, 1968, 
Aloxe-Corton, Claude Chapuis, Dijon, 1988 
Aloxe-Corton - History of a Village, Henri Poisot, Beaune, 2007,

References

External links
 Official website
Aloxe-Corton on the old IGN website 
Aloxe-Corton on Géoportail, National Geographic Institute (IGN) website 
Aloxe on the 1750 Cassini Map

Communes of Côte-d'Or